Baron Henri Hottinguer, was born at castle Piple on 15 September 1868, the first-born son of Baron Rodolphe Hottinguer. He had a long and prosperous life, and during his era the bank, Hottinger & Cie, accomplished many achievements. He took control of Hottinger and Cie around the age of 52, following the death of his father.

Like his grandfather and his father, at the age of 20 he prepared for his first great voyage bound for England, where he would study finance at Oxford University. After completing his education, he went to the United States of America. Like all the barons in the family, Hottinguer had to do this voyage. During his time in America he was successful, he established many contacts that would help in the future. Also, like some of his predecessors, he would meet an American woman who would become his wife, Marian Hall Munroe, daughter of Wall Street banker John Munroe. His journeys did not stop there, he would go on a prolonged tour around Europe, by traveling to Lithuania and Russia.

Under his direction, Hottinger & Cie participated in the creation of Banque de l'Union Parisienne, which then merged with the Crédit du Nord. He was one of the leading parties in the funding of the Trans-Siberian Railway. 
He died suddenly on 21 July 1943. He was succeeded by his oldest son  Baron Rodolphe Hottinguer (1902-1985).

See also
Hottinguer Family
Hottinger Group

Sources
Youssef Cassis, Capitals of Capital, A History of International Financial Centres, 1780–2005. ( | )
Max Gerard, Messieurs Hottinguer Banquiers A Paris, Paris 1968.
www.trans-siberia.com
www.hottinger.co.uk
www.credit-du-nord.fr

1868 births
1943 deaths
Henri
Barons of France
French bankers
Regents of the Banque de France
French Protestants